Peel was a provincial riding in Central Ontario, Canada. It elected one member to the Legislative Assembly of Ontario.  It was created in 1867 for the area west of Toronto and York County, west of Halton County/Trafalgar Township, going north from Lake Ontario to Caledon / Albion (ending at the boundaries with Dufferin and Simcoe Counties). After 1967 Peel was split into two as Peel North and Peel South.

Members of Provincial Parliament: Peel (1867-1967)

Members of Provincial Parliament: Peel North (1967-1975)

Members of Provincial Parliament: Peel South (1967-1975)

Sources

External links
Elections Ontario Past Election Results

Former provincial electoral districts of Ontario